Scytodes is a genus of spitting spiders that occur all around the world. The most widely distributed species is Scytodes thoracica, which originally had a palearctic distribution, but has been introduced to North America, Argentina, India, Australia, and New Zealand. The genus was first described by Pierre André Latreille in 1804.  Spitting spiders have pale yellow bodies with black spots on their cephalothorax, and legs that are characterized by black bands.

Behavior

Reproduction
Spitting spiders are typically solitary until mating or hunting due to their aggressive nature. Males are cautious when trying to find a mate. Females carry their eggs until they hatch, typically under their body or in their chelicerae. This is the most vulnerable stage in life, the egg-carrying period. Upon hatching, the juvenile spiders remain in their mother's web. They cooperatively capture and feed on prey caught in the web. Upon reaching sexual maturity, the young spiders leave the web, move a short distance away and exhibit solitary behavior. The genus exhibits sexual dimorphism, males range in size from 3.5 to 4 mm while females are slightly larger ranging from 4 to 4.5 mm. These spiders do not die post-mating; males live 1.5–2 years and females live 2 to 4 years.

Spitting
The spitting from which its name derives is used as a method of trapping prey or escaping predators. Sticky gum is expelled from their fangs and can be shot up to ten body lengths from the spider. When the string of venomous substance is shot, anywhere from 5 to 17 parallel overlapping bands cover the meal and kill it.

Species
 Scytodes contains 219 species and 1 subspecies. Spitting spiders often are found in temperate and terrestrial habitat regions such as forests in South America, the Caribbean, Central America, Africa, Europe, Asia, North America, Oceania, and on the Pacific Islands:. In the presence of humans, these spiders are found in dark corners, cellars, cupboards, and closets of houses.

References

Scytodidae
Araneomorphae genera
Cosmopolitan spiders
Taxa named by Pierre André Latreille